The Agreement of Nationalist Unity, frequently known under the name of its constituent parties, Canarian Coalition–Canarian Nationalist Party (CC–PNC), is a permanent Canarian nationalist alliance formed by Canarian Coalition (CC) and Canarian Nationalist Party (PNC) in 2006 ahead of the 2007 Canarian regional election. The alliance has been renewed several times, in 2011, 2013 and 2018. For the 2011 and November 2019 general elections it was joined by New Canaries (NC).

Composition

Members

Allies

Former members

Electoral performance

Parliament of the Canary Islands

Cortes Generales

European Parliament

Notes

References

Political parties established in 2006
Political parties in the Canary Islands
2006 establishments in Spain
Canarian nationalism
Centrist parties in Spain
Nationalist parties in Spain